Sepia cultrata, commonly known as the knifebone cuttlefish or elongated cuttlefish, is a species of cuttlefish from the family Sepiidae endemic to the southern Indo-Pacific. It is a deepwater species found in subtropical and temperate Australian waters.

Description 
Sepia cultrata has a pale buff pinkish brown colour. It has a crescent-shaped club with a flattened sucker bearing 5 or 6 small suckers in transverse rows. The cuttlebone is an elongate oval shape with triangular pointed anterior and narrow posterior ends. It has a salmon-coloured dorsal surface with ribbing: the median rib is distinct and narrow, flanked by two faint lateral ribs. Its mantle grows to a maximum size of 12 cm.

Distribution 
Its Australian distribution includes waters of Queensland, New South Wales, Victoria, Tasmania, South Australia and Western Australia.

Habitat and ecology 
The knifebone cuttlefish typically inhabits waters between 300 and 500 m deep. The species' known depth range extends from 132 to 803 m.

Naming 
The type specimen was collected in Twofold Bay, New South Wales and was described by William Evans Hoyle in 1885.

References 

Cuttlefish
Molluscs described in 1885